Centennial Park is a large municipal park with many sports facilities, maintained by the Parks, Forestry and Recreation Division of the city of Toronto, Ontario, Canada.

History
The park was opened in 1967 for Canada's 100th birthday by the then-Borough of Etobicoke and was part of the Hirons' dairy farm (the remaining part of the farm was sold for residential development in 1968).

In 1976, the park was one of two venue sites for the 1976 Summer Paralympics.

In 1998, when the six municipalities constituting Metropolitan Toronto were amalgamated, the park was integrated into Toronto Parks and Recreation from the former City of Etobicoke Parks Department. This should not be confused with an identically named small city park in the east end of Toronto, on Centennial Road, Scarborough, which was also inherited by the amalgamation.

In 2015, the park hosted the BMX cycling at the 2015 Pan American Games. After the Games, the BMX track became a legacy site for public use.

In November 2022, the City of Toronto announced the closure of skiing and snowboarding activities at the park, citing declining use due to the COVID-19 pandemic and mechanical issues with the lifts. Reducing snow cover during winter months may also have factored into the decision, but were not directly mentioned by the city. Earl Bales Park remains the only ski and snowboard centre in the city of Toronto.

Features

The park has a variety of features including:

Centennial Park Conservatory
 Etobicoke Olympium, a large athletic centre that was built in 1975.
 Centennial Hill was the site of a municipal dump and the south end was used as a transfer station.
 Centennial Park Stadium, a 3,500 seat capacity stadium that is primarily used for athletics, soccer and occasionally for kabaddi.
 Centennial Park Arena 2 pads 
 In the mid to late 1970s there was a Motocross track at Centennial park, open for riding and also held Motocross races on Sundays. Mike Austin's MRAC Motorcycle Racing Association of Canada ran the races.
 8 lane polytan track and field facility
 go-cart track
 golf course 120 acres
 picnic areas
 7 soccer fields
 one baseball diamond
 five softball diamonds
 Designated Toboggan Hill
 Splash Pad
 Playground Equipment
 Flying Circles
 2 Cricket Pitches
 Disc Golf Course
 Exercise Course (Kiwanis)
 7 acres marshland/wetlands
 11 acre man made pond
 Centennial Park Pan Am BMX Centre

See also
 Centennial Park (Scarborough)
 North York Ski Centre
 Uplands Ski Centre
 Beaver Valley Ski Club

References

External links
 The Etobicoke Creek Watershed

Parks in Toronto
Etobicoke
Canadian Centennial